Mackenson Altidor (born 20 June 1984) is a Bahamian international footballer who plays as a defender.

Career

Club
Altidor played college soccer for Northern Oklahoma College and Temple University, before playing senior soccer for the Ocean City Barons and the Lancaster Inferno.

International
He made his international debut for Bahamas in 2004, and has appeared in FIFA World Cup qualifying matches.

References

1984 births
Living people
People from Central Abaco
Association football defenders
Bahamian footballers
Bahamas international footballers
Temple Owls men's soccer players
Ocean City Nor'easters players
Lancaster Inferno (NPSL) players
USL League Two players
Expatriate soccer players in the United States
Bahamian expatriate footballers
Bahamian expatriate sportspeople in the United States
BFA Senior League players